Piʻilaniwahine II (piʻilani = "ascent to heaven", wahine = "woman/wife") was a Hawaiian High Chiefess. She is known to us today from the old chants.

Piʻilaniwahine lived in ancient Hawaii. Piʻilaniwahine’s mother was Kekaikuʻihala I;  Piʻilaniwahine’s father was Kalanikaumakaowākea.

Piʻilaniwahine married twice. First she married Ahu-a-ʻI; their child was Queen Lonomaʻaikanaka of Hawaiʻi. Piʻilaniwahine's second husband was Moana. Their son was named Lono, after the god.

References

Royalty of Maui
Hawaiian princesses